The Great Egg Harbor River is a  river in South Jersey. It is one of the major rivers that traverse the largely pristine Pinelands, draining  of wetlands into the Atlantic Ocean at Great Egg Harbor, from which it takes its name.

Great Egg Harbor (and thus the river) got its name from Dutch explorer Cornelius Jacobsen May. In 1614, Mey came upon the inlet to the Great Egg Harbor River. The meadows were so covered with shorebird and waterfowl eggs that he called it "Eyren Haven" (Egg Harbor).  Today, the National Park Service considers it one of the top 10 places in North America for birding.

Description

The lower  of the river provide a navigable estuary as far as Mays Landing. The Tuckahoe River enters Great Egg Harbor just to the south of the mouth of the river.

Before the arrival of Europeans to the area in the 18th century, it was inhabited by Lenape. During the American Revolutionary War, its estuary sheltered privateers. The presence of "bog iron" along the river provided material for cannonballs and led to the construction of blast furnaces, as well as glass and brick factories, until the middle of the 19th century.

In 1992, the United States Congress designated  of the river and its tributaries as the Great Egg Harbor Scenic and Recreational River, as part of the National Wild and Scenic Rivers System. It is the longest canoeing river within the Pinelands. The river is noted for its tea-colored "cedar water", the product of the iron and tannin content of the fallen cedar leaves along much of its length. It provides abundant habitat for waterfowl in the region. The fish populations include striped bass and alewife herring.

As of July 2015,  of land along the river in Atlantic County is owned and administered by the New Jersey Division of Fish and Wildlife as the Great Egg Harbor River Wildlife Management Area.

See also

 List of New Jersey rivers
 List of New Jersey wildlife management areas

Tributaries
English Creek
Hospitality Branch
South River
Stephen Creek

References

External links

 National Park Service – Great Egg Harbor River

Rivers of Atlantic County, New Jersey
Rivers of Camden County, New Jersey
Rivers of Gloucester County, New Jersey
Rivers in the Pine Barrens (New Jersey)
Rivers of New Jersey
National Park Service areas in New Jersey
National Park Service Wild and Scenic Rivers
Protected areas of the Pine Barrens (New Jersey)
Protected areas established in 1992
1992 establishments in New Jersey
Wild and Scenic Rivers of the United States